Member of the House of Assembly may refer to:

Australia
 A member of the South Australian House of Assembly (MHA)
 A member of the Tasmanian House of Assembly

Canada
 A member of the Newfoundland and Labrador House of Assembly

See also
 Member of the National Assembly (Quebec) (MNA) 
 Member of Provincial Parliament (Ontario) (MPP)
 Member of the Legislative Assembly (MLA), in all other provinces and territories of Canada

Parliamentary titles